Sandhya Nagaraj (born 30 August 1988) is an Indian former professional tennis player.

Nagaraj has career-high WTA rankings of 511 in singles, achieved on 17 July 2006, and 581 in doubles, set on 14 May 2007. She has won 1 singles and 2 doubles titles on the ITF Women's Circuit.

In 2006 Her only WTA Tour main draw appearance came at the Kolkata she partnered with countrywoman Isha Lakhani in the doubles event. But first round lost Ukrainian Yuliya Beygelzimer and Yuliana Fedak.

ITF finals

Singles (1 titles, 1 runner–ups)

Doubles (2 titles, 3 runner–ups)

References

External links
 
 

1988 births
Living people
Indian female tennis players